Herman Point is a satellite of Blue Knob mountain in Pennsylvania and one of the few summits in the state which exceed  feet. This summit is located in the Blue Knob State Park and serves as the trailhead for the "Lost Turkey Trail". Herman Point is also the site of FAA towers and the old fire lookout which has since been removed.

References
 

 

Mountains of Pennsylvania
Allegheny Mountains
Mountains of Bedford County, Pennsylvania